Sir John Bingham, 5th Baronet (1690 – 21 September 1749) was an Irish politician.

He was the eldest son of Sir George Bingham, 4th Baronet, and his first wife Mary Scott. Bingham was educated at the Middle Temple. He was appointed High Sheriff of Mayo in 1721 and was Governor of County Mayo. In 1727, he entered the Irish House of Commons for Mayo, the same constituency his father had represented before, and sat for it until his death in 1749. In 1730, he succeeded his father as baronet.

By 1730, he married Anne Vesey, daughter of Agmondisham Vesey and had five daughters and three sons. Bingham died in 1749 and was buried at Castlebar. He was succeeded in the baronetcy successively by his sons John and Charles.

References

1690 births
1749 deaths
Bingham Baronets, of Castlebar
Irish MPs 1727–1760
Politicians from County Mayo
Members of the Middle Temple
Members of the Parliament of Ireland (pre-1801) for County Mayo constituencies
High Sheriffs of Mayo